The Liechtenstein Rugby Union is the governing body for rugby in Liechtenstein. It oversees the various national teams and the development of the sport.

See also
 Rugby union in Liechtenstein

External links
Liechtenstein Rugby Union

Rugby union in Liechtenstein
Rugby
Rugby union governing bodies in Europe
Sports organizations established in 2010
2010 establishments in Liechtenstein